Mauricio José Rojas Mullor (born June 28, 1950) is a Chilean-Swedish politician and political economist, member of the Riksdag between 2002 and 2006. He served as Minister of Cultures, Arts and Heritage of Chile for four days, since August 10 2018 until August 13, under the presidency of Sebastián Piñera.

Mauricio Rojas was born in Santiago, Chile. As an active socialist and member of MIR in his youth, he fled to Sweden in 1974 following the military coup and the subsequent persecution of leftist activists by the new Pinochet regime. After coming to Sweden as a refugee he changed his political views and became a proponent for liberalism.

Rojas received a Ph.D. in economic history from Lund University in 1986 and became Docent (Associate Professor) of Economic History at Lund University in 1995. Rojas was lecturer at Lund University from 1981 to 1999, when he became the Director of the Centre for Welfare Reform at the Stockholm-based think tank Timbro. Lately he was both Vice President and President of Timbro.

Rojas was elected as a Member of Parliament in 2002 for the Liberal Party, although he was not a party member at the time. He became a member of the Liberal People's Party in 2004 when he was appointed as the party's spokesperson on refugee and integration policy. In 2006 he initiated a second period in Parliament. He is member of the Constitutional Committee of the Swedish Parliament.

He has written several books in the field of international economics, immigration matters and on the Swedish model, many of them translated into several languages. Available in English are The Rise and Fall of the Swedish Model (London, 1998), Millennium Doom (London, 1999), Beyond the Welfare State (Stockholm, 2001) and The Sorrows of Carmencita: Argentina’s Crisis in a Historical Perspective (Stockholm, 2002). His latest published book is Reinventar el Estado del bienestar (Madrid, 2008).

External links
Riksdagen: Mauricio Rojas (fp)
Mauricio Rojas - Folkpartiet

1950 births
Academic staff of Lund University
Chilean emigrants to Sweden
Chilean former marxists
Culture ministers of Chile
Government ministers of Chile
Living people
Members of the Riksdag 2002–2006
Members of the Riksdag 2006–2010
Members of the Riksdag 2022–2026
Members of the Riksdag from the Liberals (Sweden)
People from Santiago
Revolutionary Left Movement (Chile) politicians
Swedish politicians of Chilean descent